Eggenberg Castle is a castle located in Vorchdorf, Upper Austria. It is famous for its brewery.

History
Beer has been brewed at Eggenberg Castle since the 14th century. Commercial brewing at its location began in 1681 when Michael Weismann purchased the property from the Monastery of Kremsmünster. It has been owned by the Forstinger-Stöhr family since 1803.

Samichlaus
Samichlaus is one of the strongest lager beers in the world, at 14% alcohol by volume. The name means Santa Claus in Swiss German. It was originally brewed by the Hürlimann Brewery in Zürich, Switzerland.

Hürlimann's founder Albert Hürlimann was a world leader in the scientific study of yeast, and the brewery has a long history of yeast development. The Samichlaus Christmas beer was first brewed in 1979 for sale in 1980. Production continued annually until 1997, when the brewery closed. In 2000, it returned, this time produced by Schloss Eggenberg in collaboration with the original Hürlimann brewers, using the original Hürlimann Samichlaus recipe.
The beer is only brewed once a year, on December 6 (which is the day of Saint Nicholas), which makes it a relatively rare brew. It is in the style of a Bavarian Doppelbock, and undergoes unusually long fermentation by traditional cold lagering over a ten-month period, leaving very little residual sugar in the final beer.

Notes

External links

Schloss Eggenberger history
Homepage Schloss Eggenberg brewery
RateBeer

Beer in Austria
1681 establishments in Austria